José Patrocinio Jiménez Bautista (born 17 January 1953) is a Colombian former professional racing cyclist. He rode in four editions of the Tour de France and three editions of the Vuelta a España.

Major results

1974
 3rd Road race, National Road Championships
 6th Overall Vuelta a Venezuela
 8th Overall Vuelta a Colombia
1st Young rider classification
1975
 2nd Overall Vuelta a Colombia
1976
 1st  Overall Vuelta a Colombia
1st  Mountains classification
1st Stage 9
 1st  Overall Clásico RCN
1st Stage 2
 1st  Overall Vuelta a Guatemala
1st Mountains classification
1st Points classification
1st Stages 2, 7, 8 & 12
1977
 1st  Overall Vuelta al Táchira
1st Stage 2
 1st  Overall Vuelta a Guatemala
1st Mountains classification
1st Stages 2, 4 & 8
 2nd Overall Vuelta a Colombia
 2nd Overall Clásico RCN
1978
 1st  Overall Vuelta a Cundinamarca
1st Points classification
1st Stage 2
 2nd Overall Vuelta al Táchira
1st Mountains classification
1st Points classification
1st Stage 5
 2nd Overall Vuelta Ciclista de Chile
1st Mountains classification
 6th Overall Clásico RCN
1979
 2nd Overall Clásico RCN
1st Mountains classification
 2nd Overall Vuelta Ciclista de Chile
1st Stage 3
 3rd Overall Vuelta a Colombia
1st Mountains classification
1st Stage 7
1980
 1st  Overall Vuelta a Antioquia
1st Mountains classification
1st Stage 1
 2nd Overall Vuelta a Boyacá
1st Mountains classification
1st Stages 3 & 4
 3rd Overall Vuelta a Colombia
1st Mountains classification
 3rd Overall Coors Classic
 6th Overall Tour de l'Avenir
1st Stage 7
 7th Overall Clásico RCN
1st Mountains classification
1981
 1st  Overall Vuelta a Cundinamarca
 2nd Overall GP Tell
1st Stages 6a & 6b
 3rd Overall Tour de l'Avenir
1st  Mountains classification
1st Stage 8
 4th Overall Clásico RCN
 5th Overall Vuelta a Colombia
1st Mountains classification
1st Stage 10
1982
 1st  Overall Coors Classic
1st Stages 3 & 6
 1st  Overall Vuelta a Antioquia
 3rd Overall Vuelta Ciclista de Chile
1st Stage 2
 4th Overall Clásico RCN
1st Stage 9
 5th Overall Vuelta a Colombia
1983
 1st  Overall Vuelta a Cundinamarca
 3rd Overall Vuelta a Colombia
 4th Overall Clásico RCN
1984
 2nd Subida al Naranco
 6th Trofeo Masferrer
 7th Overall Vuelta a España
 8th Subida a Urkiola
 9th Overall Volta a Catalunya
1985
 6th Overall Escalada a Montjuïc
1986
 1st Stage 4b Vuelta a Boyacá

Grand Tour general classification results timeline

References

External links
 

1953 births
Living people
Colombian male cyclists
Sportspeople from Boyacá Department
Vuelta a Colombia stage winners
20th-century Colombian people